Onthophagus unifasciatus, is a species of true dung beetle native to India and Sri Lanka.

Description
Average length is about 6 to 9 mm. Body is short, compact and shining. Dorsum coppery green or dark blue in color. Elytra bright yellow, and decorated with a broad irregular black median band. There is a spot upon the 5th interval close to the base, as well as a transverse spot linking the apical margin. Pronotum strongly punctured which is obliquely retuse in front.

The species is identified as a cause for the disease Scarabiasis, where specimens were collected from human faeces. There were many reports of children mainly between the ages of 1 and 5 years passing live beetles with their faeces in Sri Lanka.

References

External links
 New cytological data of dung beetle species from the genus Onthophagus Latreille (Coleoptera: Scarabaeidae, Scarabaeinae) from Haryana

Scarabaeinae
Insects of Sri Lanka
Insects of India
Insects described in 1783